The Minister for Women is a minister in the New South Wales Government with responsibility for hospitals and health services in regional New South Wales, Australia.

There had been a Women’s Co-ordination Unit and a Women’s Advisory Council since at least 1977 for which the Premier and later the Minister for Family and Community Services had been responsible. In 1993 in the third Fahey ministry these functions were brought together in a portfolio aimed at changing the portrayal of women, improving their status at home, at work and in the community, and reducing violence against women. From the first Carr ministry it was renamed Minister for Women. A separate portfolio of Prevention of Domestic Violence and Sexual Assault was created in the second Baird ministry.

The portfolio became part of the portfolio of Mental Health, Regional Youth and Women in the second Berejiklian ministry.

In the second Perrottet ministry since December 2021 it is one of five portfolios in the Stronger Communities cluster working with the Minister for Families, Communities and Disability Services, Natasha Maclaren-Jones.  The current minister Bronnie Taylor also holds the portfolios of Mental Health and Regional Health. The other ministers in the cluster are:

 the Minister for Veterans, currently David Elliott, since 21 December 2021;
 the Minister for Multiculturalism and Minister for Seniors, currently Mark Coure, since 21 December 2021;
 the Minister for Regional Youth, currently Ben Franklin, since 21 December 2021.

List of ministers

Related ministry

References

Women